Mala Dobron is a village in Uzhhorod Raion of Zakarpattia Oblast in western Ukraine. It had a population of 1,872, according to the 2001 census. Ethnic Hungarians make up a significant majority of the population.

Population
According to the Ukrainian 2001 census, the population of Mala Dobron included:
Hungarians (98.45%)
Ukrainians (1.23%)
Russians (0.05%)
Moldovans (0.05%)
Other ethnicities (0.22%)

Notable residents
 Erika Gerceg, Hungarian-Ukrainian singer

References

Villages in Uzhhorod Raion